Grigory Shilkin (born 20 October, 1976, Arkhangelsk) is a Russian political figure and a deputy of the 8th State Duma.
 
In 1997, Shilkin started working at the Krasnoyarsk Machine-Building Plant. From 2004 to 2021, he was the General Director of the Arkhangelsk Specialized Energy Enterprise. Since September 2021, he has served as deputy of the 8th State Duma.

References
 

 

1976 births
Living people
New People politicians
21st-century Russian politicians
Eighth convocation members of the State Duma (Russian Federation)
Politicians from Arkhangelsk